Sale FC is a semi-professional rugby union club based at Heywood Road in Sale, Greater Manchester, England, which plays in National League 1 following promotion from National League 2 North at the end of the 2017–18 season. Premiership club Sale Sharks is the professional offshoot of Sale FC.

History 

Formed by a team of sportsmen drawn mainly from Sale Cricket Club, Sale Football Club was founded in 1861 and is the fifth oldest surviving rugby club. In the early days of the club, rules were usually deemed unnecessary and those that were enforced were often made up on the spot. As the game began to evolve, however, the need for specified regulations became apparent and in 1865 the Minute Book was created stipulating the ten rules to be followed by all players. This is reputedly world's oldest existing rugby rule book and a much treasured possession. Games were originally played on either a rented portion of Sale Cricket Club or on fields owned by local farmers. In 1905, the club bought a field at the end of Heywood Road.

Sale FC have featured many prominent international and county players. Pat Davies became their first England international in 1927 and the 1930s saw an international backline of Hal Sever (England wing), Claude Davey and Wilf Wooller (Wales centres) and Ken Fyfe (Scotland wing). Fran Cotton, Steve Smith, Dewi Morris, Richard Trickey and Jason Robinson also played at Sale.Eric Evans played for and captained England as hooker.For many years there was an Eric Evans Stand.

In 1936, Sale were invited to take part in the Middlesex Sevens Cup and went on to win the competition.

Before World War II, an increase in membership meant that the club had almost outgrown facilities at Heywood Road and an additional site on Woodbourne Road was purchased. Initially this was meant to be a training ground for the junior team, but there were talks to eventually relocate the rest of the club there too, but when war was over it was instead decided to focus efforts on the redevelopment of Heywood Road. Land was sold to fund the project and the ground gradually began to evolve. A new clubhouse was built, the old bath house replaced by squash courts, changing facilities improved, floodlights installed and the commemorative Jim Birtles Stand erected.

Current season

Facilities 

In December 2017 at their home game against Sedgley Tigers, Sale FC opened their Suite @Sale hospitality suite. This new suite overlooking the main pitch with sliding windows onto the balcony, seats 190 for meals in the main room, 24 people in the Executive Suite and has two bars. There is also a bar downstairs named after Steve Smith "Smithys". The new development includes a new gymnasium and a Martial Arts facility used by TaeKwonDo.

Training ground 

Sale FC Rugby also own the Sale FC Rugby Training ground on Carrington Lane. This high performance facility has four pitches, one of which is floodlit and a training resource area including dining room, performance analysis suite and it is also where Minis and Juniors train on Sunday mornings and Thursday evenings. This is also the home venue for Sale FC 1861, Sale FC Vikings and Sale FC Senior Colts.
The gymnasium provides rehab, strength and condition facilities and changing rooms. Recently the club house has had a complete refurbish and now contains a bar and a cafe.

Mascot 

On 23 December 2017 the club unveiled a new mascot, Trickey the Mutt.

Teams 
Sale FC currently has Four senior teams
 Sale FC 1st Team playing in National One 
 Sale FC Vikings new entry to the leagues 2022-23 season 
 Sale FC 1861 women's team playing in Championship North Two
 Sale FC Chargers Touch Rugby Team

Sale FC also has

 Sale FC Senior Colts
 Sale FC Junior Colts
 More than 350 Juniors and Minis

Touch Rugby 
In the 2022-2023 season, Sale FC have added a touch rugby team to their club. Manchester Chargers in the search for a new home have joined forces with Sale FC to form Sale FC Chargers. Home games and training are at Sale FC Training Centre Carrington Lane.

Honours 
Old amateur club (pre Sale Sharks)
 Middlesex Sevens winners: 1936
 Glengarth Sevens Davenport Plate winners (2): 1968, 1985
 Cheshire Cup winners (17): 1970, 1973, 1974, 1975, 1976, 1977, 1978, 1979, 1980, 1981, 1982, 1983, 1984, 1985, 1986, 1987, 1997
 Glengarth Sevens Main Event Champions: 1978
 Courage League National Division Two champions: 1993–94

Modern amateur club (post Sale Sharks)
 South Lancs/Cheshire 4 champions: 2003–04
 South Lancs/Cheshire 3 champions: 2004–05
 South Lancs/Cheshire 2 champions: 2005–06
 Cheshire Plate winners: 2006
 South Lancs/Cheshire 1 champions: 2011–12
 Cheshire Bowl winners: 2012
 North Division 1 West champions: 2012–13
 Cheshire Vase winners: 2013
 Cheshire Cup winners: 2014 2019
 National 3 North champions: 2014–15
 National League 2 North champions: 2017–18

References

External links 
 Sale FC Rugby Club Official Website

1861 establishments in England
English rugby union teams
Rugby clubs established in 1861
Sale, Greater Manchester
Sale Sharks
Sports clubs in England